Gene E. Sherman (November 13, 1921 - August 27, 2000) was a pioneer radio and television sportscaster in Iowa.  He worked for KCAU-TV in Sioux City, Iowa as a sports commentator in broadcasting.

Biography

For a number of years, Gene Sherman and Dave Dedrick cohosted the Big Bowl from Sioux City, Iowa.

For more than twenty years, Gene Sherman was the voice of the Chargers at Briar Cliff College.  He was inducted into the Charger Hall of Fame in 1999.

References

External links
 Gene Sherman in the Charger Hall of Fame at Briar Cliff University
 Whatever happened to bowling on TV?- bowling tournaments broadcast by Gene Sherman and Dave Dedrick.

Iowa television reporters
People from Iowa
1921 births
2000 deaths